The Cowdenbeath by-election, 2014 was a by-election held for the Scottish Parliament constituency of Cowdenbeath on 23 January 2014.

Background
The by-election was held following the death of the constituency's MSP, Helen Eadie, who had been diagnosed with cancer the previous year.

Eadie had represented Cowdenbeath since the first election to the Scottish Parliament in 1999, making her one of the few MSPs to have served in the Scottish Parliament continuously since its inception. Prior to the 2011 election the seat was known as Dunfermline East. In the 2011 election Eadie held the seat with 46.5% of the vote and a majority of 1,247 votes (4.9%) over the second placed Scottish National Party candidate.

Result
In the by-election, the seat was held by Labour candidate Alex Rowley, increasing Labour's vote share to 55.8% and majority to 27.4% over SNP candidate Natalie McGarry, with an 11.25% swing.

Previous Result

2016 Scottish Parliament election
Despite Labour's by-election success, in the subsequent 2016 Scottish Parliament election Annabelle Ewing gained the constituency for the SNP, although Rowley was re-elected to the Scottish parliament as an additional member for the Mid Scotland Fife region.

See also
Cowdenbeath, and its predecessor, Dunfermline East
Elections in Scotland
List of by-elections to the Scottish Parliament

References 

Cowdenbeath by-election
2010s elections in Scotland
Politics of Fife
Cowdenbeath by-election
Cowdenbeath 2014
21st century in Fife
Cowdenbeath
Cowdenbeath by-election